The Coates Swalesong is a 1970s British two-seat homebuilt monoplane.

Development and operational history
The Swalesong S.A.II was designed and built by J. R. Coates. It is a low-wing wooden construction (spruce with plywood skin) cantilever monoplane with a fixed tricycle undercarriage, with pilot and passenger sitting side-by-side in an enclosed cockpit with a sliding canopy. It first flew on 2 September 1973, powered by a  Continental PC60 Ground Power Unit converted to Continental C90 standard.

Only one S.A.II G-AYDV and one simplified S.A.III were built. The Swalesong S.A.II survives at Breighton Airfield, East Yorkshire. The CAA G-INFO website shows that its registration is current in February 2021.

Variants
Swalesong S.A.I
Designation of Luton Minor registration G-AMAW built by Jim Coates in the 1950s, not connected with S.A.II or S.A.III
Swalesong S.A.II
Prototype, one built.
Swalesong S.A.III
Simplified design for amateur construction, one built.

Specifications (SAII)

References

 

1970s British civil utility aircraft
Homebuilt aircraft
Low-wing aircraft
Single-engined tractor aircraft
Aircraft first flown in 1974